Sir Bertram Clough Williams-Ellis, CBE, MC (28 May 1883 – 9 April 1978) was a Welsh architect known chiefly as the creator of the Italianate village of Portmeirion in North Wales. He became a major figure in the development of Welsh architecture in the first half of the 20th century, in a variety of styles and building types.

Early life

Clough Williams-Ellis was born in Gayton, Northamptonshire, England, but his family moved back to his father's native North Wales when he was four. The family have strong Welsh roots and Clough Williams-Ellis claimed direct descent from Owain Gwynedd, Prince of North Wales. His father John Clough Williams Ellis (1833–1913) was a clergyman and noted mountaineer while his mother Ellen Mabel Greaves (1851–1941) was the daughter of the slate mine proprietor John Whitehead Greaves and sister of John Ernest Greaves.

He was educated at Oundle School in Northamptonshire. Though he read for the natural sciences tripos at Trinity College, Cambridge, he never graduated. After a few months at the Architectural Association School of Architecture in London in 1903–04 (which he located by looking up "Architecture" in the London telephone directory), he worked for an architect for a few months before setting up his own practice in London. His first commission was Larkbeare, a summer house for Anne Wynne Thackeray in Cumnor, Oxfordshire, in 1903-04 (finished 1907) which he designed while still a student.

In 1908 he inherited a small country house, Plas Brondanw, from his father, which he would restore and embellish through the rest of his life, as well as rebuilding it after a fire in 1951.

Military service
Williams-Ellis served with distinction in the First World War, first with the Royal Fusiliers and then with the Welsh Guards as an intelligence officer attached to the Tank Corps. He was described as lieutenant on the day of his wedding.

Architectural career

After the war, Williams-Ellis helped John St Loe Strachey (later his father-in-law) revive pisé construction in Britain,  building an apple storehouse followed by Harrowhill Copse bungalow at Newlands Corner using shuttering and rammed earth.

One of his earliest designs of 1905 was for a pair of Welsh labourers' cottages in a vernacular style with end gable chimneys which imitate the 16th-century Snowdonia Houses In 1909 he was to design a house in an advanced Arts and Crafts style for Cyril Joynson at Brecfa in Breconshire In 1913–1914 he was to be responsible for the rebuilding of Llangoed Hall in Breconshire, one of the last country houses to be built before the First World War. While it is a mixture of a number of historic styles, it was a modern features with elements such as the chimneys derived from the work of Lutyens Other work in Wales by Clough Williams-Ellis includes the Festiniog Memorial Hospital of 1922, Pentrefelin Village Hall, the Conway Fall Cafe.

In 1925, Williams-Ellis acquired the land in North Wales that would become the Italianate village of Portmeirion (made famous in the 1960s as the location of the cult TV series The Prisoner). Portmeirion is notable not only as an architectural composition, but also because Clough Williams- Ellis was able to preserve fragments from other now demolished buildings from Wales and Cheshire. These include the plaster ceiling from Emral Hall

In 1928, Williams-Ellis wrote his book England and the Octopus (published in 1928); its outcry at the urbanization of the countryside and loss of village cohesion inspired a group of young women to form Ferguson's Gang. They took up Williams-Ellis's call for action and from 1927 to 1946 were active in rescuing important, but lesser-known, rural properties from being demolished. Shalford Mill in Surrey, Newtown Old Town Hall on the Isle of Wight and Priory Cottages in Oxfordshire were all successfully saved due to the Gang's fundraising efforts. The Gang endowed these properties and significant tracts of the Cornish coastline to the care of the National Trust. The Gang's mastermind Peggy Pollard (known within the Gang by her pseudonym Bill Stickers) and Williams-Ellis became lifelong friends.

In 1929 Williams-Ellis bought portrait painter George Romney's house in Hampstead.

By the 1930s, Williams-Ellis had become a fashionable British architect; he was commissioned to create numerous works throughout the UK. These include buildings at Stowe, Buckinghamshire, cottages in Cornwell, Oxfordshire, Tattenhall in Cheshire, and Cushendun, County Antrim, Northern Ireland. During the 1930s he also designed the former summit building on Wales' highest mountain, Snowdon. However, after a reduction in window sizes (they kept blowing in) and further alterations in the 1960s and the 1980s, it was in a poor state by the end of the 20th century. Prince Charles described it as "the highest slum in Wales".

Williams-Ellis served on several government committees concerned with design and conservation and was instrumental in setting up the British national parks after 1945. He wrote and broadcast extensively on architecture, design and the preservation of the rural landscape. He was a member of the Knickerbocker Club.

At Aberdaron he designed the Old Post Office in a vernacular style in 1950. An important later commission was the redesign and rebuilding of Nantclwyd Hall in Denbighshire Clough Williams- Ellis was equally capable in working in the Modernist idiom of the interwar years. This is well demonstrated by the recently restored Caffi Moranedd at Cricieth and the now demolished Snowdon Summit Station of 1934, which was demolished in 2007.

In 1958 Williams-Ellis was made a Commander of the Order of the British Empire (CBE) "for public services". He was made a Knight Bachelor in the New Years Honours List of 1972 "for services to the preservation of the environment and to architecture". At the time, he was the oldest person ever to be knighted.

Personal life
In 1915 Williams-Ellis married the writer Amabel Strachey. Their eldest daughter, Susan Williams-Ellis (1918–2007), used the name Portmeirion Pottery for the company she created with her husband in 1961. The second daughter, Charlotte Rachel Anwyl Williams-Ellis (1919–2010), was a zoologist and environmentalist with a Cambridge PhD in agricultural science. She married the agriculturalist Lindsay Russell Wallace in 1945, and moved to New Zealand. Their youngest child, Christopher Moelwyn Strachey Williams-Ellis (1923 – 13 March 1944) served as a lieutenant in the Welsh Guards during the Second World War. He was killed in action and is buried at Minturno War Cemetery.

Welsh language novelist Robin Llywelyn is his grandson, and fashion designer Rose Fulbright-Vickers is his great-granddaughter. Sculptor David Williams-Ellis, the stepfather of Edoardo Mapelli Mozzi, is his great-nephew.

Death
Sir Clough Williams-Ellis died in April 1978, aged 94. In accordance with his wishes, he was cremated. Twenty years after his death some of his ashes were placed in a marine rocket that was launched in a New Year's Eve firework display over the estuary at Portmeirion.

Works

Architecture
 See List of works by Clough Williams-Ellis

Writings
Reconography (by student in BEF, pseudodonym Graphite) Pelman (1919 and 4 editions)
England and the Octopus, London, Geoffrey Bles (1928)
Cottage Building in Cob, Pise, Chalk and Clay: a Renaissance (1919)
The Architect, London, Geoffrey Bles (1929)
Cautionary Guide to Oxford, Design and Industrial Association (1930), 32 pages
Cautionary Guide to St Albans, Design and Industrial Association (1930) 32 pages
Laurence Weaver – a Biography, London, Geoffrey Bles (1933)
Architecture Here and Now, London, T Nelson and Sons (1934)
The Adventure of Building: being something about architecture and planning for intelligent young citizens and their backward elders, London, Architectural Press (1946), 91 pages
An Artist in North Wales, London, Elek (1946), pictures by Fred Uhlman, 40 pages
On Trust for the Nation (2 vols), London, Elek (1947), pictures by Barbara Jones, 168 pages
Living in New Towns, London (1947)
Town and Country Planning, Longmans, Green, London and British Council (1951), 48 pages
Portmeirion, The Place and its Meaning, London (1963, revised edition 1973)
Roads in the Landscape, Ministry of Transport (1967), 22 pages
Architect Errant: The Autobiography of Clough Williams Ellis, London, Constable (1971), 251 pages
Around the World in Ninety Years, Portmeirion (1978)

With others

Clough & Amabel Williams-Ellis, The Tank Corps (A War History), London (1919)
 The Pleasures of Architecture London, Jonathan Cape (1924)
 and Introduction by Richard Hughes, Headlong Down the Years, Liverpool University Press (1951), 118 pages
Susan, Charlotte, Amabel and Clough Williams-Ellis, In and Out of Doors, London, Geo Routledge and Sons (1937), 491 pages
With John Maynard Keynes, Britain and the Beast, London, Dent (1937), 332 pages
With John Strachey, Architecture (1920, reprinted 2009), 125 pages
With Sir John Summerson, Architecture Here and Now

Sources
 Haslam, R. (1996), Clough Williams-Ellis, RIBA Drawings Monograph No2. 
 Haslam R. et al. (2009), The Buildings of Wales: Gwynedd, Yale University Press.
 Scourfield R. and Haslam R. (2013), The Buildings of Wales: Powys; Montgomeryshire, Radnorshire and Breconshire, Yale University Press.

References

External links

 Official Portmeirion site
 Plas Brondanw
 
 

1883 births
1978 deaths
20th-century Welsh architects
Alumni of Trinity College, Cambridge
Architects from Northamptonshire
British Army personnel of World War I
Commanders of the Order of the British Empire
Knights Bachelor
Military personnel from Northamptonshire
People educated at Oundle School
People from Gayton, Northamptonshire
Recipients of the Military Cross
Royal Fusiliers officers
Welsh Guards officers